Riccardo Martignago (born 6 August 1991) is an Italian football player who plays for  club Alessandria.

Club career
He made his Serie B debut for Cittadella on 8 May 2010 in a game against Frosinone.

On 8 August 2019, he signed a 2-year contract with Teramo. On 30 January 2020, he joined Alessandria on loan.

On 30 September 2020 he joined Ravenna on a two-year contract.

On 20 August 2021, Martignago joined to AlbinoLeffe.

On 18 October 2022, he returned to Alessandria.

References

External links
 

1991 births
People from Montebelluna
Footballers from Veneto
Living people
Italian footballers
Association football midfielders
Serie B players
Serie C players
Serie D players
Calcio Montebelluna players
A.S. Cittadella players
Latina Calcio 1932 players
U.S. Catanzaro 1929 players
U.S. Pistoiese 1921 players
Pordenone Calcio players
A.C. Mestre players
Albissola 2010 players
S.S. Teramo Calcio players
U.S. Alessandria Calcio 1912 players
Ravenna F.C. players
U.C. AlbinoLeffe players
Sportspeople from the Province of Treviso